Uiliami Leilua Vi known by his Tongan noble title Hon. Lord Veehala (1925–1986) was a Tongan nobleman best known as  nose-flute player.  He remains undoubtedly the most famous Tongan musician, both at home and abroad, and his recordings are still traditionally the first broadcast every day by Radio Tonga.

Background
He was born on March 23, 1925 in Nuku’alofa to Hon. Lord Veehala (Feleti Vi) and Mele Luisa Simoa Vi of Fahefa Estate, Tongatapu. He was educated at Tupou College and finishing off at Wesley College and Grammar School, Auckland, New Zealand. In 1946, after his father's death he was installed upon the noble title of Veehala and inherited the Fahefa estate. He was a governor of Ha'apai and Keeper of Public Records from 1948 - 1953, than from 1950 - 1968, he was the Secretary of Traditions Committee in Tonga.

Marriage and Issue
He married Eva-i-pomana Ulukalala, natural daughter of Hon. Lord Finau Ulukalala VI (Ha'amea).  They had two sons and one daughter

Death
He died of unknown circumstances on November 26, 1986 and his son succeeded him as Hon. Lord Veehala.

References
  Free Tree Maker Genealogy. Retrieved 2010-10-24

1925 births
1986 deaths
Tongan flautists
20th-century flautists